2-Heptanol is a chemical compound which is an isomer of heptanol.  It is a secondary alcohol with the hydroxyl on the second carbon of the straight seven-carbon chain.

2-Heptanol is chiral, so (R)- and (S)- isomers exist.

See also
 1-Heptanol
 3-Heptanol
 4-Heptanol

References

Alkanols